An ultra light displacement boat (or ULDB) is a modern form of watercraft with limited displacement relative to the hull size (waterline length).

ULDBs are competitive, even after 35 years with open ocean racing participation and podium finishes even today. The relative low cost to obtain, tough construction and readily easy modifications make an Olson or a Hobie an extremely competitive and fun boat. The boats do lack comfort, and are not designed for cruising; however, with multiple transpac races, and multiple Bermuda 1-2 entries, they are proving to be a stalwart competitor despite their older design.

See also
Bill Lee (yacht designer)
George Olson (yacht designer)
Olson 30
Hobie 33
International Offshore Rule
Ron Moore (boat builder)
Sportsboat

References

Shipbuilding
Nautical terminology